The 7 May 2013 bombing at an election rally is the deadliest of a series of attacks that hit the town of Doaba in the district of Hangu which has a history of sectarian violence. Recently this region became a flashpoint for violence between Sunni and Shiite Muslims as Pakistan prepares to hold a general election and provincial elections on May 11, which will mark the country's first democratic transition of power.

A suicide bomber attacked a rally for Syed Janan, a candidate of the Jamiat Ulema-e-Islam party. Mufti Syed Janan was reportedly the main target but he left the scene with minor injuries. At least 18 people were killed and 40 people including 11 children were injured in the attack of 7 May 2013, which raised the total number of fatalities, in pre-election violence since April, to over 100. According to the police officer Haleem Khan the suicide bomber was on a motorcycle and detonated near the vehicle carrying election candidate Syed Janan.

Janan later told the press, "I was on my election campaign and coming to my vehicle when the bomber blew himself up. I received some injuries but survived. Two of my guards were seriously wounded."

It was one of the attacks that targeted candidates from Islamist parties, indicating a new trend in the pre-election violence, which had only occurred with secular parties before this week. A curfew was imposed after these attacks. Investigations are going on and the site is cordoned off.

See also
War in North-West Pakistan
Tehrik-i-Taliban Pakistan

References

2013 murders in Pakistan
21st-century mass murder in Pakistan
Mass murder in 2013
Terrorist incidents in Pakistan in 2013
Suicide bombings in Pakistan
Crime in Khyber Pakhtunkhwa
2013 elections in Pakistan
Tehrik-i-Taliban Pakistan attacks
Electoral violence in Pakistan